Darryl James Webster (born 7 May 1962) is a former English professional cyclist from Walsall.

Cycling career
He rode for Great Britain at the Olympic Games and won twenty three national championship titles. He also famously won a stage in the 1988 Nissan Classic from a 101-mile solo break. Webster has always claimed to be strongly against the use of drugs in sport, but in April 2013 he was caught growing cannabis worth £24,000.

He represented England and competed in the 4,000 metres individual pursuit and won a bronze medal in the 4,000 metres team pursuit, at the 1982 Commonwealth Games in Brisbane, Queensland, Australia.

Palmarès 
1978
1st GHS Schoolboy National TT 10 miles championship
1980
1st Overall National Junior Road Series
3rd Junior World Championships, Track, Team Pursuit 
1981
 3rd British National Hill Climb Championships
1982
3rd Commonwealth Games, Track, Team Pursuit
1983
 5th Tour of the Cotswolds
 1st British National Hill Climb Championships
1984
 4th Overall, Sealink International
 2nd Overall, Circuit des Mines
 1st British National Hill Climb Championships
DNF Olympic Games, Road race
8th Olympic Games, 100 kilometres Team Time Trial
1985
 1st British National Hill Climb Championships
  4th British National Road Race Championships (Amateur)
1st Lincoln GP
1986
 1st British National Hill Climb Championships
 3rd Lincoln GP
1987
 2nd Archer Grand Prix
 1st Manx Trophy
 2nd Lincoln GP
 2nd Overall, Premier Calendar
1988
 8th Overall, Tour of Britain
 21st Grand Prix des Nations
 1st Gwent
 1st Windermere
  26th British National Road Race Championships (Professional)
 31st Overall, Nissan Classic
 1st Stage 3, Nissan Classic
1989
 8th GP Wales 
  29th British National Road Race Championships (Professional)

References

External links 

 wielrennen.hour.be

1962 births
Living people
English male cyclists
Olympic cyclists of Great Britain
Cyclists at the 1984 Summer Olympics
Sportspeople from Walsall
Commonwealth Games medallists in cycling
Commonwealth Games bronze medallists for England
Cyclists at the 1982 Commonwealth Games
Medallists at the 1982 Commonwealth Games